The 2019 Nigerian House of Representatives elections in Kogi State was held on February 23, 2019, to elect members of the House of Representatives to represent Kogi State, Nigeria.

Overview

Summary

Results

Adavi/Okehi 
A total of 16 candidates registered with the Independent National Electoral Commission to contest in the election. APC candidate Joseph Bello won the election, defeating PDP Onimisi Itopa and 14 other party candidates. Bello received 59.32% of the votes, while Itopa received 28.37%.

Ajaokuta 
A total of 18 candidates registered with the Independent National Electoral Commission to contest in the election. APC candidate Idirisu Lawal won the election, defeating PDP Okino Adeiza and 16 other candidates. Lawal received 53.76% of the votes, while Adeiza received 45.76%.

Ankpa/Omala/Olamaboro 
A total of 20 candidates registered with the Independent National Electoral Commission to contest in the election. APC candidate Ali Abdullahi Ibrahim won the election, defeating PDP Habiba Muhammed Deen and 18 other party candidates. Ibrahim received 48.62% of the votes, while Deen received 33.99%.

Bassa/Dekina 
A total of 14 candidates registered with the Independent National Electoral Commission to contest in the election. APC candidate Abdullahi Hassan won the election, defeating PDP Benjamin Idani Okolo and 11 other candidates. Hassan received 62.62% of the votes, while Okolo received 27.27%.

Ibaji/Idah/Igalamela/Odolu 
A total of 21 candidates registered with the Independent National Electoral Commission to contest in the election. APC candidate David Idris Zacharias won the election, defeating PDP Emmanuel Egwu and 12 other candidates. Zacharias received 53.23% of the votes, while Egwu received 32.39%.

Kogi (Lokoja)/Kogi (K.K.) 
A total of 17 candidates registered with the Independent National Electoral Commission to contest in the election. APC candidate Isah Abdulkareem Usman won the election, defeating PDP Shaba Ibrahim and 15 other party candidates. Usman received 51.81% of the votes, while Ibrahim received 46.69%.

Okene/Ogori-Magogo 
A total of 20 candidates registered with the Independent National Electoral Commission to contest in the election. APC candidate Yusuf Tijani won the election, defeating PDP Isah Suka Mohammad and 18 other party candidates. Tijani received 96.80% of the votes, while Mohammad received 2.30%.

Yagba East/Yagba West/Mopamuro 
A total of 15 candidates registered with the Independent National Electoral Commission to contest in the election. ADC candidate Leke Joseph Abejide won the election, defeating APC Henry Abimbola and 13 other candidates. Abejide received 40.95% of the votes, while Abimbola received 28.93%.

References 

Kogi State House of Representatives elections
House of Representatives
Kogi